Trashland is the second and last studio album by Brazilian post-punk band Mercenárias. It was released in 1988 via EMI, and produced by Edgard Scandurra (of Ira! and Ultraje a Rigor, and a long-time friend and former member of Mercenárias) and Thomas Pappon (of Voluntários da Pátria, Smack and Fellini fame). Contrasting with the aggressiveness of the punk-like sonority of their previous album, Cadê as Armas?, Trashland is characterized by more atmospheric pieces reminiscent of Siouxsie and the Banshees, with emphasis given to the tracks "Kyrie", "Angelus", "Mesmas Leis", "Lembranças" and "Provérbios do Inferno", a compilation of William Blake's Proverbs of Hell translated into Portuguese and set to music.

The album received critical acclaim, and was chosen as "Album of the Year" by magazine Bizz. Despite this, EMI fired the band for no apparent reason, leading to its end in the same year and an 18-year hiatus before their reunion in 2006.

Track listing

Personnel
 Ana Machado – guitar
 Lourdes "Lou" Moreira – drums
 Rosália Munhoz – vocals
 Sandra Coutinho – bass
 Bocato – trombone (track 10)
 Edgard Scandurra – guitar (tracks 2, 3 and 7)
 Thomas Pappon – piano (track 12)
 Silvano Michelino – percussion (tracks 1, 7, 8, 9, 10 and 11)
 Michel Spitale – cover art

References

External links
 Trashland at Discogs

1988 albums
Mercenárias albums
Portuguese-language albums